Saints who were named Donatus include:
 Saint Donatus of Muenstereifel, 2nd century military martyr and a patron against lightning
 Saints Donatus, Romulus, Secundian, and 86 Companions, 3rd century
 Saint Donatus of Arezzo, bishop of Arezzo (?-362) (feast day: August 7)
 Saint Donatus of Thmuis, 4th-century martyr and successor of the also martyred St. Phileas as bishop of Thmuis, a city of Lower Egypt in the Roman province Augustamnica Prima, suffragan of Pelusium
 Saint Donatus of Euroea, otherwise Donatus of Buthrotum, bishop of Euroea (d. 387) (feast day: April 30)
 Saint Donatus of Orleans, hermit on Mount Jura, France (d. ca. 535, feast day August 19)
 Saint Donatus of Fiesole, an Irish monk who became bishop of Fiesole in 824 (feast day October 22)
 Saint Donatus of Zadar, Dalmatian bishop from early 9th century (feast day February 25).
 Saint Donatus, a Christian martyr of Sicily.  See Saint Placidus (martyr).
 Saint Donatus, a companion of the African Saint Quirinus (feast day June 3).
 Saint Donatus of Libya
 Saint Donatus of Besançon, bishop of Besançon (7th century)
 Saint Donatus of Ripacandida, 12th-century Benedictine monk

Donatus